Les Chappell (born 6 February 1947 in Nottingham, England) is an English footballer who played as a striker.

Chappell began his career with Rotherham United in 1965 and was a part of the team for over three seasons, scoring regularly. Following the Millers' relegation he joined Blackburn Rovers before moving onto Reading in 1969.

He became a key player for Reading over the next five years before moving to Doncaster Rovers. Chappell finished his league football career with Swansea City, joining the coaching staff. He was caretaker manager from March to May 1984 following the dismissal of John Toshack and again in December 1984 following the dismissal of Colin Appleton.

External links
 

English footballers
Rotherham United F.C. players
Blackburn Rovers F.C. players
Reading F.C. players
Doncaster Rovers F.C. players
Swansea City A.F.C. players
English football managers
Swansea City A.F.C. managers
1947 births
Living people
Footballers from Nottingham
English Football League players
Association football midfielders